The 1973 European Ladies' Team Championship took place 5–8 July at Royal Golf Club de Belgique, 7 kilometres south-east of the city center of Brussels, Belgium. It was the eighth women's golf amateur European Ladies' Team Championship.

Format 
All participating teams, allowed to have six players, played one qualification round of stroke-play with five players, counted the four best scores for each team.

The six best teams formed flight A, in knock-out match-play over the next three days. The teams were seeded based on their positions after the stroke play. The teams place first and second were directly qualified for the semi finals. The team placed third was drawn to play the quarter final against the team placed sixth and the teams placed fourth and fifth met each other. In each match between two nation teams, two 18-hole foursome games and five 18-hole single games were played. Teams were allowed to switch players during the team matches, selecting other players in to the afternoon single games after the morning foursome games. Games all square after 18 holes were declared halved, if the team match was already decided.

The four teams placed 7–10 in the qualification stroke-play formed Flight B and the three teams placed 11–13 formed Flight C, to meet each other to decide their final positions.

Teams 
13 nation teams contested the event. Each team consisted of a minimum of four players.

Players in the leading teams

Other participating teams

Winners 
Defending champion team England won the opening 18-hole competition, with a score of 13 over par 309, one stroke ahead of three times champion France.

Individual leader in the opening 18-hole stroke-play qualifying competition was Mary Everard, England, with a score of 4-under-par 70, three shots ahead of 17-year-old Federica Dassù, Italy. Everard's round included four birdies and an eagle. There was no official award for the lowest individual score.

The first three places went to the same nations as at the previous championship two years earlier. Team England won the championship, earning their fourth title, beating France in the final 4–3. Team Sweden finished third for the third time, beating Spain 4–3 in the third place match.

Results 
Qualification round

Team standings

* Note: In the event of a tie the order was determined by the better non-counting score.

Individual leaders

 Note: There was no official award for the lowest individual score.

Flight A

Bracket

Final games

Flight B

Final standings

Sources:

See also 
 Espirito Santo Trophy – biennial world amateur team golf championship for women organized by the International Golf Federation.
 European Amateur Team Championship – European amateur team golf championship for men organised by the European Golf Association.

References

External links 
 European Golf Association: Results

European Ladies' Team Championship
Golf tournaments in Belgium
European Ladies' Team Championship
European Ladies' Team Championship
European Ladies' Team Championship